Stanislas Anselmetti (1892 – 18 August 1952) was a Swiss racewalker. He competed in the 3 km walk and the 10 km walk events at the 1920 Summer Olympics.

References

External links
 

1892 births
1952 deaths
Swiss male racewalkers
Olympic athletes of Switzerland
Athletes (track and field) at the 1920 Summer Olympics